Victoria "Tori" Allen-Martin is a British actress, director and producer. She is known for the television series Pure (2019) and has also taken leading roles in Unforgotten (2018) and London Kills (2019).

In 2009 she founded and headed Interval Productions as its Creative Director. Interval Productions has produced eight musicals which include Streets which was nominated in the Best New Musical category. Allen-Martin together with co-writer Sarah Henley were also nominated for most promising new playwrights.

Allen-Martin was shortlisted under the writers category for BBC New Talent Hotlist 2017.

Filmography

Television

Stage

References

External links
 
 

Living people
English women singers
English musical theatre actresses
English stage actresses
English television actresses
Year of birth missing (living people)